Sarajevo City Center (SCC) is a business complex and shopping center in downtown Sarajevo, Bosnia and Herzegovina, that consists of three main parts: a shopping mall and leisure complex, a five star hotel tower and a commercial offices tower, with a common 4-storey underground parking area with more than 1100 parking spaces.

The building site is located in Marijin Dvor neighborhood, close to the centers of public administration, as well historical (museums), educational (campus of the state university) and business (UNITIC, Avaz Twist Tower and similar). The public transportation is also in its vicinity which enables one to reach the old town of the city in about five minutes.

The SCC Media facade, used for broadcasting advertising, the news, latest in sport, weather forecast, winning games, two-way communication, is the largest in the country and one of the largest video billboards in Europe.

Shopping mall and entertainment center
The Shopping Mall offers worldwide known brands in fashion, sports and technology. It is spread upon  and contains around 80 shops. Turk Mall is in charge of space leasing and mall management.

The entertainment center is situated on the third (playland) and fourth floor (bowling, laser, bumper cars, children's playroom, simulator games, billiards), while more than 15 restaurants are present with more than 550 seats.

Hotel
All rooms feature a flat screen TV, coffee and tea making machines, as well as an electronic safe.

References

External links

Pictures of the construction site

Buildings and structures in Sarajevo
City Center
Shopping malls in Sarajevo
Skyscrapers in Bosnia and Herzegovina
Skyscraper office buildings in Bosnia and Herzegovina
Skyscraper hotels